CJKS-FM (branded as Jukasa Radio) is a Canadian radio station broadcasting at 93.5 FM in Ohsweken, Ontario, as a Type B Native FM radio station.

The station first went on the air on 13 January 2016 and broadcasts local news and information from Six Nations of the Grand River to that community. Its music format includes Top 40, Hip hop, and R&B. Jukasa Radio simulcasts on the internet through Radioboss at http://ca2.radioboss.fm:8018/index.html?sid=1

Jukasa Radio is owned and operated by Arrow Radio, a not-for-profit corporation controlled by its board of directors.

References

External links
 Jukasa Radio
 
 

Jks
Jks
Radio stations established in 2016
2016 establishments in Ontario
Mississaugas